Muhammad Riaz Shaheen Bangash is a Pakistani politician who was a member of the Provincial Assembly of Khyber Pakhtunkhwa from August 2019 to January 2023.

Political career
Shaheen contested 2019 Khyber Pakhtunkhwa provincial election on 20 July 2019 from constituency PK-108 (Kurram-I) on the ticket of Jamiat Ulema-e-Islam (F). He won the election by the majority of 602 votes over the independent runner up Malik Jameel Khan. He garnered 12,240 votes while Khan received 11,638 votes.

References

Living people
Jamiat Ulema-e-Islam (F) politicians
Politicians from Khyber Pakhtunkhwa
Year of birth missing (living people)